Savanna is a city in Carroll County, Illinois, United States. The population was 2,783 at the 2020 census, down from 2,945 at the 2010 census. Savanna is located along the Mississippi River at the mouth of the Plum River. Going from north to south, the second automobile bridge between Iowa and Illinois is located just north of Savanna, and is part of U.S. Route 52. The bridge leads to Sabula, Iowa, which is across the river from Savanna. Savanna is also served by two major railroads, the Burlington Northern and Santa Fe Railway (BNSF) Railway Company and the Canadian Pacific Railway (CP). These rail lines were formerly operated by the Burlington Route and the Milwaukee Road respectively. Savanna also has a small airport, the Tri-Township Airport (KSFY).

Savanna is protected by the Savanna Police, Fire Department and Ambulance Service. All three organizations maintain stations on Chicago Avenue. The three organizations were located in the same building (a throwback to when the fire department was responsible for the ambulance) but the original building only houses the fire department and one of the backup centers for Carroll County 911 dispatch. Savanna formerly had its own hospital, but this has since been converted to an assisted living facility, Pinnacle Place. All ambulance patients are transported to Mercy Medical Center in Clinton, Iowa or other Illinois hospitals. The Savanna Ambulance is one of two in the county to have paramedic certified members (a distinction shared with the Mount Carroll Volunteer Ambulance.)

History
The region was once part of the vast hunting grounds of different native American tribes, including the Sauk. Following the Treaty of St. Louis (1804) and a number of additional treaties, land in Illinois along the Eastern bank of the Mississippi River was opened to settlement by farmers. Towns such as Savanna grew their commerce by using the river for efficient transport. Savanna's earliest settlers experienced some repercussions during the Black Hawk War in 1832.

Savanna Army Depot
In 1917, the United States Army purchased  of land about seven miles (11 km) north of Savanna to construct the Savanna Army Depot.  Originally the land was to be used as a test range for munitions produced at the Rock Island Arsenal in Rock Island, Illinois.  In 1921, the mission of the installation was changed to be a depot./. From World War II through Vietnam, Savanna Army Depot served as a munitions maintenance and storage facility for traditional, chemical, and nuclear weapons.

With about 2,000 highly trained civilian employees holding Government security clearances working there in the '60s, this base was guarded and protected by the 516th Military Police Company, U.S. Army Materiel Command.  Armed with .45 caliber sidearms, 12 gauge pump-action shotguns, state-of-the-art electronic surveillance systems, gas masks, etc. as standard daily issue, these 300 highly educated and very well trained MP's ensured 24/7 safety and security for all concerned.  The 516th's primary mission, however, was to operate and defend what was then known as the "J Area" - where the munitions were actually stored and handled by civilian employees.  Nothing went in or out of the J Area without MP scrutiny - including employee lunch boxes.

By 1995, the Savanna Army Depot was identified by U.S. Congress as one of the bases that would be closed under the Base Realignment and Closure Act or BRAC.  On March 18, 2000, the Savanna Army Depot was closed.

The Jo-Carroll Depot Local Redevelopment Authority (LRA) was established in 1997 by an intergovernmental agreement between the Illinois counties of Jo Daviess and Carroll to redevelop the former Savanna Army Depot.

These are some of the many companies that have chosen an area onsite called "Savanna Depot Park" as their home.

 Area 51 LLC, a grain bin operation
 Bryer Productions, a photography business
 Commander’s House at the Savanna Army Depot, owned by A&B Holdings, plans are to make the house a destination for corporate and family retreats
 Depot Electric Supply 
 Fluidic MicroControls, which is doing research and development on micro turbines 
 Illinois Information Management, which is leasing its space for office use
 Illinois International Trade Center, operated by the Jo-Carroll Foreign Trade Zone
 Jeanblanc International Inc, which specializes in advanced environmental technologies for the oil industry 
 Midwest 3PL (Third Party Logistics), a full-service warehousing operation
 Rescar, a railcar repair company.
 Riverport Railroad LLC, which services, repairs and stores railcars as well as coupling long lines of rail cars for the BNSF 
 Savanna Stables, which owns former barracks and a barn that SolRWind plans to lease or buy
 Speer Recycling, a metal recycler

Geography

Savanna is located at  (42.090069, -90.140050). 

Demographics

As of the 2020 census there were 2,783 people, 1,503 households, and 666 families residing in the city. The racial makeup of the city was 87.21% White, 2.01% African American, 0.50% Native American, 0.14% Asian, 0.04% Pacific Islander, 3.52% from other races, and 6.58% from two or more races. Hispanic or Latino of any race were 9.09% of the population.

There were 1,503 households, out of which 33.07% had children under the age of 18 living with them, 36.46% were married couples living together, 6.59% had a female householder with no husband present, and 55.69% were non-families. 48.24% of all households were made up of individuals, and 22.69% had someone living alone who was 65 years of age or older. The average household size was 2.83 and the average family size was 1.91.

The city's age distribution consisted of 19.4% under the age of 18, 4.2% from 18 to 24, 23.8% from 25 to 44, 27.2% from 45 to 64, and 25.4% who were 65 years of age or older. The median age was 48.2 years. For every 100 females, there were 84.8 males. For every 100 females age 18 and over, there were 88.2 males.

The median income for a household in the city was $32,067, and the median income for a family was $51,842. Males had a median income of $39,600 versus $14,650 for females. The per capita income for the city was $27,187. About 15.0% of families and 13.5% of the population were below the poverty line, including 4.6% of those under age 18 and 16.4% of those age 65 or over.

Today
The downtown area has revived since the mid-1990s closing of the army depot with the addition of new ornamental lighting to complement the late 19th century buildings. The city is trying to draw more shops to the main street in hopes of becoming more of a weekend destination, like nearby Galena. Havencrest Castle has also been revived and is a historical art gallery that attracts visitors to the Savanna area.

The Savanna Chamber of Commerce and other community groups sponsor several activities throughout the year that include: the annual Ladies Day Out Luncheon, Savanna Celebrates Independence Day parade and festival, Halloween Parade, the popular Shadfly Festival and a downtown Christmas Walk.

Savanna contains the only stoplight in all of Carroll County.

Notable people
Savanna has produced many notable natives.  These include Helen Scott Hay, an American Red Cross nurse during World War I, "America's Waltz King" Wayne King, Hollywood orchestrator Edward B. Powell, professional wrestler Tommy Treichel, Billy Zoom (Tyson Kindell) founding member and original guitarist of the punk band X, MLB player Pete Lister, and former NASA astronaut Dale Gardner.

References

External links

Visit Savanna Illinois
Savanna Chamber of Commerce
City of Savanna
Savanna Depot Park

 
Cities in Carroll County, Illinois
Cities in Illinois
Illinois populated places on the Mississippi River